Ezhangtan Station is a station of Guangzhou Metro Line 8, located underground on the north-eastern side of Ezhangtan Street, Xicha Road, Tongde Subdistrict, Baiyun District, Guangzhou, Guangdong Province, China. The station was opened on November 26, 2020 with the opening of the northern extension of Guangzhou Metro Line 8.

The station has an underground island platform. Platform 1 is for trains towards Jiaoxin, whilst platform 2 is for trains towards Wanshengwei.

Exits
There are 2 exits, lettered A and D. Exit A is accessible. All exits are located on Xicha Road.

Gallery

References

Railway stations in China opened in 2020
Guangzhou Metro stations in Baiyun District